Peter Yarrow (born May 31, 1938) is an American singer and songwriter who found fame for being in the 1960s folk trio Peter, Paul and Mary. Yarrow co-wrote (with Leonard Lipton) one of the group's best known hits, "Puff, the Magic Dragon". He is also a political activist and has supported causes that range from opposition to the Vietnam War to school anti-bullying programs.

Early life and family
Peter Yarrow was born in Manhattan, the son of Vera Wisebrode (née Vira Burtakoff) and Bernard Yarrow. His parents were educated Ukrainian Jewish immigrants, whose families had settled in Providence, Rhode Island.

Bernard Yarrow (1899–1973) attended the Jagiellonian University (Kraków, Poland) and the Odessa University (Odessa, Ukraine), before emigrating to the United States in 1922 at the age of 23. He anglicized his surname from Yaroshevitz to Yarrow, obtained a Bachelor of Science degree from Columbia University in 1925 where he joined Phi Sigma Delta fraternity, and in 1928 graduated from Columbia Law School. He then maintained a private law practice in New York City until 1938, when he was appointed an assistant district attorney under the then-district attorney, Thomas E. Dewey. In 1944 he was recruited into the Office of Strategic Services, where he served with distinction.

After the war, Bernard Yarrow joined Sullivan and Cromwell, the Dulles brothers' law firm. He was a founding board member of the National Committee for a Free Europe, an anti-Communist organization. In 1952 he became a senior vice-president of the CIA-funded Radio Free Europe, an organization he helped to found.

Yarrow's mother Vera (1904–1991), who had come to America at age three, became a speech and drama teacher at New York's Julia Richman High School for girls. She and Bernard divorced in 1943 when their son Peter was five, and Vera subsequently married Harold Wisebrode, the executive director of the Central Synagogue in Manhattan. Bernard Yarrow married his wartime London OSS partner Silvia Tim, and converted to Protestantism.

Peter Yarrow spent the summers of 1951 and 1952 at Interlochen's Music camp.  Peter graduated second in his class among male students with a physics prize from New York's High School of Music and Art, where he had studied painting. He was accepted at Cornell University as a physics major but soon switched majors, graduating with a Bachelor of Arts in psychology in 1959. Among his Cornell classmates were Thomas Pynchon, Richard Fariña and David Shetzline.

Music career

Yarrow began singing in public during his last year at Cornell while participating in Harold Thompson's popular American Folk Literature course, colloquially known on campus as "Romp-n-Stomp". The course was "a highlight of late-1950s student life at Cornell", Yarrow reminisced, and the ability to sing and play guitar was a prerequisite for enrollment. Thompson would lecture on a topic for 20 or 30 minutes and afterwards a student would sing songs related to his theme. The experience of performing in front of a large audience was a thrilling one for Yarrow, who discovered he loved it. He branched out to lead community sings on weekends.

Upon graduation, Yarrow played in folk clubs in New York City, appeared on the CBS television show Folk Sound USA, and performed at the Newport Folk Festival, where he met manager and musical impresario Albert Grossman. One day, the two were at Israel Young's Folklore Center in Greenwich Village discussing Grossman's idea for a new group that would be "an updated version of the Weavers for the baby-boom generation ... with the crossover appeal of the Kingston Trio". Yarrow noticed a picture of Mary Travers on the wall and asked Grossman who she was. "That's Mary Travers," Grossman said. "She'd be good if you could get her to work." The lanky, blonde Kentucky-born Travers was well connected in Greenwich Village folk song circles. While still a high-school student at the progressive Elizabeth Irwin High School she had been picked out by Elizabeth Irwin's chorus leader Robert De Cormier to sing in a trio called The Song Swappers, backing up Pete Seeger in the 1955 Folkways LP reissue of the Almanac Singers' The Talking Union and two other albums. As well as performing twice with Seeger at Carnegie Hall, Travers had also played a folksinger in a short-lived Broadway play called The Next President, starring satirist Mort Sahl, but she was known to be painfully introverted and loath to sing professionally.

To draw Travers out, "Mr. Yarrow went to Ms. Travers's apartment on MacDougal Street, across from the Gaslight, one of the principal folk clubs. They harmonized on 'Miner's Lifeguard', a union song, and decided that their voices blended. To fill out the trio, Ms. Travers suggested Noel Stookey, a friend doing folk music and stand-up comedy at the Gaslight." They chose the catchy "Peter, Paul and Mary" as the name for their group, since Noel Stookey's middle name was Paul, and rehearsed intensively for six months, touring outside New York before debuting in 1961 as a polished act at The Bitter End nightclub in Greenwich Village. There, the singers quickly developed a following and signed a contract with Warner Brothers.

Warner released Peter, Paul and Mary's "Lemon Tree" as a single in early 1962. The trio then released "If I Had a Hammer", a song written in 1949 by Pete Seeger and Lee Hays to protest the imprisonment of Harlem City Councilman Benjamin J. Davis, Jr. under the Smith Act. "If I had a Hammer" garnered two Grammy Awards in 1962. The trio's first album, the eponymous Peter, Paul & Mary, remained in the Top 10 for ten months and in the Top 20 for two years; it sold more than two million copies. The group toured extensively and recorded numerous albums, both live and in the studio.

In June 1963, Peter, Paul and Mary released a 7" single of "Blowin' in the Wind" by the then-relatively unknown Bob Dylan, who was also managed by Grossman. "Blowin' in the Wind" sold 300,000 copies in the first week of release; by August 17, it was number two on the Billboard pop chart, with sales exceeding one million copies. Yarrow recalled that when he told Dylan he would make more than $5,000 from the publishing rights, Dylan was speechless. On August 28, 1963, Peter, Paul and Mary  appeared on stage with the Reverend Martin Luther King Jr. at his historic March on Washington where their performance of "Blowin' in the Wind" established it as a civil rights anthem. Their version also spent weeks on Billboards easy listening chart. By 1964 the 26-year-old Yarrow had joined the Board of the Newport Folk Festival, where he had performed as an unknown just four years earlier. 
 
Yarrow's songwriting helped to create some of Peter, Paul and Mary's best-known songs, including "Puff, the Magic Dragon", "Day Is Done", "Light One Candle", and "The Great Mandala". As a member of the trio, he earned a 1996 Emmy nomination for the Great Performances special LifeLines Live, a highly acclaimed celebration of folk music, with their musical mentors, contemporaries, and a new generation of singer-songwriters.

Yarrow was instrumental in founding the New Folks Concert series at both the Newport Folk Festival and the Kerrville Folk Festival. His work at Kerrville has been called his "most important achievement in this arena".

Yarrow co-wrote and produced "Torn Between Two Lovers", a number one hit for Mary McGregor. He also produced three CBS TV specials based on "Puff, the Magic Dragon", which earned an Emmy nomination for him. In 1978 Yarrow organized Survival Sunday, an antinuclear benefit, and after a period of separation, he was once again joined by Stookey and Travers.

Yarrow and his daughter, Bethany Yarrow, often perform together. Together with cellist Rufus Cappadocia, they form the trio Peter, Bethany, and Rufus. They released the CD Puff & Other Family Classics. In 2008, the musical special Peter, Bethany & Rufus: Spirit of Woodstock, featuring a live performance of the band, aired on public television.

Yarrow portrayed leftist intellectual Ira Mandelstam in the 2015 film While We're Young.

Social activism
Yarrow has long been an activist for social and political causes. What he did was not always popular. According to The New York Times:

Operation Respect
In 2000, in an effort to combat school bullying, Yarrow helped start Operation Respect, a nonprofit organization that brings to children, in schools and camps, a curriculum of tolerance and respect for each other's differences. The project began as a result of Yarrow and his daughter Bethany and his son Christopher having heard the song Don't Laugh at Me (written by Steve Seskin and Allen Shamblin) at the Kerrville Folk Festival.

In March 2008, Yarrow told Reuters:

Other activism
Yarrow's leadership in the campaign to free Soviet Jewry inspired another generation. Of the song "Light One Candle", Rabbi Allison Bergman Vann wrote:

In 2005, Yarrow performed in Ho Chi Minh City at a concert to benefit the Vietnam Association of Victims of Agent Orange; Yarrow pleaded with the Vietnamese for forgiveness of the United States.

Yarrow serves on the board of directors of the Connecticut Hospice.

On November 1, 2008, Yarrow performed across New York City for volunteers who worked for the presidential campaign of Senator Barack Obama.

On October 3, 2011, Yarrow, his son, and his daughter made an appearance at Zuccotti Park during the Occupy Wall Street protests, playing songs such as "We Shall Not Be Moved" and a variation of "Puff the Magic Dragon".

Yarrow is a member of Braver Angels.
On April 3, 2021, he participated in an online interfaith Passover Seder hosted by the organization.

Personal life
Yarrow has cited Judaism as one of the roots of his liberal views.

While campaigning for 1968 presidential candidate Eugene McCarthy, Yarrow met McCarthy's niece, Mary Beth McCarthy, in Wisconsin. They were married in October 1969 in Willmar, Minnesota. Paul Stookey wrote "Wedding Song (There Is Love)" as his gift for their wedding and first performed it at St. Mary's Church in Willmar. They had two children, but later divorced.
 
In December 2000, Yarrow's Larrivee acoustic guitar was stolen on an airplane flight. In early 2005, fans spotted the guitar on eBay. The FBI recovered it in Sunny Isles Beach, Florida, and returned it to Yarrow. He did not press charges, as the person it was recovered from had not stolen it.

Yarrow performed the world premiere of "The Colonoscopy Song" on the CBS early morning program The Early Show on March 9, 2010.

Yarrow has also acknowledged being an alcoholic, and sought treatment for the disease. He considers himself in recovery.

A longtime resident of New York City, Yarrow has also had a vacation home in Telluride, Colorado. Yarrow's son, Christopher, is a visual artist who in the late 2000s owned an emporium in Portland, Oregon, named The Monkey & The Rat.

Criminal conviction and pardon
In 1970, Yarrow was convicted, and served three months in prison, for taking "improper liberties" with a 14-year-old girl who went with her 17-year-old sister to Yarrow's hotel room in Washington, DC seeking an autograph. Barbara Winter, the 14-year-old, stated that Yarrow answered the door naked and then molested her. Yarrow served three months of a one-to-three-year prison sentence. He apologized for the incident, saying that "it was an era of real indiscretion and mistakes by categorically male performers. I was one of them. I got nailed. I was wrong. I'm sorry for it."

Yarrow was granted a presidential pardon by Jimmy Carter on January 19, 1981, the day before Carter's presidency ended. For decades, Yarrow avoided mention of the assault, but by the early 2000s, it became a campaign issue for politicians he supports. In 2004, U.S. Representative Martin Frost of Texas, a Democrat, canceled a fundraising appearance with Yarrow after his opponent ran a radio advertisement about Yarrow's offense; in 2013, Republican politicians in New York called on Democratic congressional candidate Martha Robertson to cancel a scheduled fundraiser with Yarrow. In 2019, he was disinvited from a folk music festival when the organizers were informed of his conviction.

In May 2021, The Washington Post wrote that "[Yarrow's] pardon by Carter — perhaps the only one in U.S. history wiping away a conviction for a sexual offense against a child — escaped scrutiny when it happened. It was granted just hours before the American hostages in Iran were freed, which captured headlines for weeks." The same article details other allegations of sexual assault of minors made against Yarrow.

Awards and honors
Yarrow received the Allard K. Lowenstein Award in 1982 for his "remarkable efforts in advancing the causes of human rights, peace, and freedom". In 1995 the Miami Jewish Federation recognized Yarrow's continual efforts by awarding its Tikkun Olam Award for his part in helping to "repair the world".

Yarrow was awarded the Kate Wolf Memorial Award by the World Folk Music Association in 1993.

In 2003 a congressional resolution recognized Yarrow's achievements and those of Operation Respect.

Discography

Peter, Paul and Mary

Solo
1972 Peter US No. 163
1973 That's Enough For Me US No. 203
1975 Hard Times
1975 Love Songs
2010 The Peter Yarrow Sing-Along Special

Peter, Bethany and Rufus
2008 Puff & Other Family Classics

Other contributions 

 Jim Stanard – Color Outside The Lines (2020) 
 Vocals on songs "Home" and "Arkansas", along with Bethany Yarrow
Lazarus - Lazarus (1971), producer 
Lazarus - A Fool's Paradise (1973), producer 
Kamifusen - Here With Me (1984), songwriter "Cherry Blossom"

Bibliography 

 Puff, the Magic Dragon, by Peter Yarrow, Lenny Lipton, Eric Puybaret (illustrator), Sterling Publishing, released in August 2007, 
 The Peter Yarrow Songbook: Favorite Folk Songs, by Peter Yarrow, Terry Widener (illustrator), Sterling Publishing, released November 4, 2008, 
 The Peter Yarrow Songbook: Sleepytime Songs, by Peter Yarrow, Terry Widener (Illustrator), Sterling Publishing, released November 4, 2008, 
 Day Is Done, by Peter Yarrow, Melissa Sweet (Illustrator), Sterling Publishing, released October 2009, 
 The Peter Yarrow Songbook: Songs for Little Folks, by Peter Yarrow, Terry Widener (Illustrator), Sterling Publishing, released May 2010,

See also 
 List of peace activists
 List of people pardoned or granted clemency by a United States president

References

External links

Peter Yarrow Interview NAMM Oral History Library (2017)

1938 births
Living people
People from Greenwich Village
Singers from Rhode Island
American folk guitarists
American folk singers
American tenors
American people of Ukrainian-Jewish descent
Jewish American songwriters
Jewish American musicians
Cornell University alumni
Fast Folk artists
Warner Records artists
American acoustic guitarists
American male guitarists
Jewish folk singers
Singer-songwriters from New York (state)
Songwriters from Rhode Island
People from Telluride, Colorado
Guitarists from Rhode Island
The High School of Music & Art alumni
20th-century American guitarists
20th-century American male musicians
21st-century American Jews
American male singer-songwriters
Singer-songwriters from Colorado
American people convicted of child sexual abuse
Prisoners and detainees of the United States federal government
Recipients of American presidential pardons